This is a list of notable sugar refineries.  This include both sugarcane mills and refineries of sugar beets, and it includes current and former facilities, and some that are listed on historic registers.

Australia

Queensland

Ageston sugar plantation
Babinda sugar mill
Bundaberg Sugar
Central Sugar Mill Ruins
CSR Refinery, New Farm
Fairymead Sugar Plantation
Farleigh Sugar Mill
Inkerman Sugar Mill
Isis Central Sugar Mill
Kalamia Sugar Mill
Millaquin sugar mill
Moreton Central Sugar Mill
Mossman Central Mill
Mulgrave Sugar Mill
Oaklands Sugar Mill
Ormiston House Estate
Pioneer Sugar Mill
Plane Creek Sugar Mill
Pleystowe Sugar Mill
Racecourse Mill
Yengarie Sugar Refinery Ruins

Victoria
CSR Refinery, Yarravillem Yarraville, Maribyrnong, (1872 to 1980s), also known as Colonial Sugar Refining Company Refinery of Yarraville.

Bangladesh
Bangladesh Sugar and Food Industries Corporation
Carew & Co (Bangladesh) Ltd
Joypurhat Sugar Mill
Shyampur Sugar Mills

Canada
Redpath Sugar Refinery (1958), sugar storage, refining and museum complex in Toronto, Ontario

China
Guangxi Guitang Group
Taikoo Sugar Refinery (1881), Hong Kong

Cuba
Camilo Cienfuegos (Santa Cruz del Norte), Hershey

Denmark
Amaliegade 4, Copenhagen
Andreas Bjørn House, Copenhagen
Behagen House, Copenhagen
Holm House, Copenhagen
Knabrostræde 3, Copenhagen
Nyhavn 11, Copenhagen
Rådhusstræde 3, Copenhagen
Højbygaard Sugar Factory, Holeby, Lolland

Dominican Republic
Engombe Sugar Mill, Santo Domingo Oeste municipality, Santo Domingo province, 1500s, UNESCO World Heritage-listed
Nigua Sugar Mill, World Heritage tentative list

Fiji

Penang (Rakiraki) Sugar Mill
Viria Sugar Mill

India
Ghodganga Sugar Factory, near Pune, in Maharashtra
Cooperative sugar factories in Maharashtra
Godavari Biorefineries

New Zealand
Chelsea Sugar Refinery, Birkenhead

Northern Mariana Islands
 Nanyo Kohatsu Kabushiki Kaisha Sugar Mill, former industrial facility in the village of Songsong on the island of Rota in the Northern Mariana Islands

Puerto Rico
Central Coloso
Central Cortada, Descalabrado, Santa Isabel
Central Guánica, Ensenada, Guánica
Central San Vicente, est. 1873 in Vega Baja
Central Mercedita, at Hacienda Mercedita, Ponce, a home of Snow White sugar

Serbia
Sugar Refinery, Čukarica (1901), Belgrade

United Kingdom
Cantley Sugar Factory, Cantley, Norfolk
Sugar factory at Wissington, Norfolk, British Sugar's largest refinery and the largest sugar refinery in Europe

United States
New Smyrna Sugar Mill Ruins (1830), also known as the Cruger and DePeyster Sugar Mill, now ruins, in New Smyrna Beach, Florida
Dunlawton Plantation and Sugar Mill, north-central Florida, which was destroyed by the Seminoles in 1836 in the Second Seminole War and rebuilt. 
Yulee Sugar Mill Ruins Historic State Park (1851-64), Homosassa, Florida
Imperial Sugar refinery in Port Wentworth, Georgia, where 14 people were killed and forty injured when a dust explosion occurred in 2008
Haʻikū Sugar Mill, Maui, Hawaii, a processing factory for sugarcane from 1861 to 1879
Waialua Sugar Mill (1865-1996), Oahu, Hawaii
Old Sugar Mill of Kōloa (1835), Kauai, Hawaii, part of the first commercially successful sugarcane plantation
McIntosh Sugarworks, near St. Marys, Georgia (1820s), now ruins
Meeker Sugar Refinery, in Rapides Parish, Louisiana
Rosalie Plantation Sugar Mill (c.1847), Rapides Parish, Louisiana
Boston Sugar Refinery, East Boston, Massachusetts
Domino Sugar Refinery, Williamsburg, Brooklyn, New York is a mixed-use development and former sugar refinery in the neighborhood of Williamsburg in Brooklyn, New York (1882-2004), replaced structures built 1856 and destroyed by a fire.
Catherineberg Sugar Mill Ruins, Saint John, U.S. Virgin Islands

See also
 Puerto Rican immigration to Hawaii

References